Batang Quiapo is a 1986 Filipino action-comedy film directed by Pablo Santiago and starring Fernando Poe Jr. and Maricel Soriano. The film is the first and only collaboration between Poe and Soriano, and was Poe's first film under Regal Films. The film broke box-office records of its time.

Plot
Maria and Tikboy are two friends in Quiapo, Manila who have made pickpocketing their means of living. They attempt to steal from Baldo, a former pickpocket who was just released from a prison in Muntinlupa after six years, only to be outsmarted by him. Baldo goes to his friend Iska, the owner of a small restaurant where Maria and Tikboy are regular customers, and is informed that she fabricated a story of Baldo being an overseas Filipino worker who just returned from Saudi Arabia so that his time in prison is hidden from others. Maria and Tikboy arrive at Iska's restaurant, only to see Baldo eating at a table, upon which he returns the wallets he took from them. 

Baldo meets up with mechanic Momoy David, an old friend of his, to ask for help in finding a job, leading to his employment as a charcutier at Mila's Special Lechon. Maria soon becomes friends with Baldo, joining him on a mission to help Mang Miniong, a friend of hers, retrieve fifty thousand pesos he paid to counterfeiters and swap it with the fake gold bar they sold to him. Maria's boisterous antics nearly disrupt the mission for Baldo, but they eventually succeed. Baldo soon admits to Maria his past as a convict, and tries to convince her to leave pickpocketing for good, to which she agrees. However, Maria sees Baldo continuously meet up with a woman, to which she becomes jealous.

Maria vents out her resentment by having drinking sessions and getting a job as an entertainer at a club, with Baldo getting irate for her doing the latter. Though Baldo begins confronting Maria about her feelings, their conversation is interrupted by Maj. Corrales, the head of police, who asks for his help in taking down a drug syndicate led by Kits that have made orphans Dodong and Caloy unwitting mules for illegal drugs. On a day when Dodong and Caloy are delivering a bird cage discreetly filled with drugs to Kits, Baldo intercepts them and removes the drugs from the cage before they send it to the syndicate. Upon the failed drug transaction, illegal drug seller Mang Paquito decides to deliver the money he earned so far to his paraplegic boss Don Julian at his mansion, only for Baldo and others to catch them in the act and capture the two for the police.

With the impending arrival of Iska's daughter Katrina and her Canadian husband George to the country, Baldo decides to temporarily use Don Julian's mansion to help Iska maintain the illusion that she has grown wealthy in the time Katrina was raised abroad. While the formal banquet at the mansion is being held, Kits and his syndicate kidnap Dodong and Caloy and calls Don Julian's telephone about their intention of bringing them there, to which Baldo answers with his voice disguised. The drug syndicate arrives at the mansion with Dodong and Caloy but are soon ambushed and summarily beaten up by Baldo's friends at the banquet. Meanwhile, Iska reveals to Katrina that the mansion is not hers, and that she is not actually wealthy, but Katrina is unbothered by this and accepts her for who she is. Katrina and George leave the banquet happy, and Momoy informs Iska that with Don Julian going to jail, the mansion now goes to her name.

Ms. Ramos, a child services woman whom Maria kept seeing with Baldo, arrives at Iska's restaurant to mention to Baldo that Dodong's papers as an orphan have all been settled, thus no longer needing to be placed in the care of social services, and that she will go to the United States soon. After Ms. Ramos leaves, Maria, who heard their conversation, excitedly embraces Baldo to the chagrin of Tikboy.

Cast

Fernando Poe Jr. as Baldomero "Baldo" Dimagiba
Maricel Soriano as Maria
Johnny Delgado as Rigor
Sheryl Cruz as Sonea
Manilyn Reynes as Mona
Kristina Paner as Caring
Chuckie Dreyfus as Dodong
Christopher Paloma as Caloy
Mel Martinez as Totoy
Anita Linda as Francisca "Iska" Abubakar
Rez Cortez as Tikboy
Dencio Padilla as Momoy "Lugaw" David
Paquito Diaz as Kits
Bomber Moran as Rading
Bayani Casimiro as Mang Paquito
Bella Flores as Mila
Augusto Victa as Miniong
Tony Carreon as Don Julian
Tina Loy as Auring
Jose Romulo as Maj. Corrales
Karim Kiram as Minero
Rudy Meyer as Sgt. Lolomboy
Abbo dela Cruz as Daga
Geena Sablan as Ms. Ramos
Dedes Whitaker as Katrina
David Anderson as George
Goons:
Nonoy de Guzman
Rene Hawkins
Eddie Tuazon
Belo Borja
Bert Garon
Bebot Davao
Renato Tanchingco
Boy Sta. Maria
Eddie Samonte
Romy Nario
Victor Bravo
Mario Caverio
Bebeng Amora
Jun Montano
Ernie David
Ronnie Olivas
Joe Estrada
George Wendth
Edgar Madriaga

Remake

Following the success of the television adaptation of Ang Probinsyano, Batang Quiapo has been pegged by various news outlets as the likeliest next project by series lead Coco Martin and a possible replacement series for the former. The rumors of the possible adaptation of Batang Quiapo as a TV series began when the film's theme, Doon Lang, was performed by Martin in a "duet" with Fernando Poe Jr. as the clip of the scene from the film was being played; said scene originally featured Poe and Maricel Soriano singing in a duet.

Martin has himself expressed interest in adapting more of Fernando Poe Jr.'s works for film and/or television, as he had also previously adapted another Poe classic Carlo J. Caparas' Ang Panday which was an entry into the 2017 Metro Manila Film Festival. In addition to the interest Martin has in adapting the series for the small screen, several names had been linked to the planned remake as a potential leading lady, such as Liza Soberano and Martin's rumored girlfriend, Julia Montes. Rumors of its supposed impending adaptation further intensified when Martin met with Manila Mayor Isko Moreno. The meeting though did not have anything to do with the adaptation of the film but was made to negotiate Moreno's cameo appearance in Martin's 2019 Metro Manila Film Festival entry, 3pol Trobol: Huli Ka Balbon!

However, with Ang Probinsyanos unprecedented run, the show having been extended multiple times, the film's adaptation was put on hold.

On December 5, 2022, Coco Martin is confirmed to star, direct, write, and to co-produce in the Batang Quiapo remake alongside Poe's daughter, Lovi Poe and Charo Santos.

References

External links

 

1986 films
1980s action comedy films
1980s musical films
1986 comedy films
Filipino-language films
Films directed by Pablo Santiago
Films about the illegal drug trade
Films about theft
Films set in Manila
Philippine romantic comedy films
Regal Entertainment films
Films about orphans